Antonio Torres (born October 22, 1994 in León, Guanajuato) is a Mexican professional footballer who plays for Tepatitlán F.C. of Liga MX.

External links
Ascenso MX

Liga MX players
Living people
Mexican footballers
1994 births
Sportspeople from León, Guanajuato

Association footballers not categorized by position
21st-century Mexican people